Bruce Dow (born April 1, 1963) is an American actor, best known for his five featured roles on Broadway, his 12 seasons in leading roles at the Stratford Festival, his Dora Mavor Moore Awards-winning performances at Buddies in Bad Times, the world's largest and longest running LGBTQ theatre, his voicing the character of Max for Total Drama Pahkitew Island and his appearances on the Rick Mercer Report and Murdoch Mysteries. He also appeared on Corn & Peg as Captain Thunderhoof's arch enemy, the Bad Bronco. He also voices Sir Topham Hatt and Harold the Helicopter (US) in Thomas & Friends: All Engines Go.

Career

Dow made his Broadway debut in Jane Eyre, and has appeared on Broadway in The Music Man,  Anything Goes, King Herod in the 2012 Tony-nominated revival of Jesus Christ Superstar which opened in the Avon Theatre in Stratford, Ontario; and then as Paul Burrell in the Diana: A True Musical Story. In the winter of 2011, Jesus Christ Superstar transferred to the La Jolla Playhouse and then to Broadway at the Neil Simon Theatre for an opening in March 2012.

Known for his critically acclaimed, non-traditional interpretations of well-known roles, Dow has appeared as the Emcee in Cabaret, directed by Amanda Dehnert, the Baker in Into the Woods, directed by Peter Hinton and as Pseudolus in A Funny Thing Happened on the Way to the Forum, directed at Stratford by Des McAnuff and later in Washington, D.C., by Alan Paul.

In 2011, appeared as 'Trinculo' in The Tempest, starring Academy Award winner Christopher Plummer.  The production debuted at the Stratford Festival, was later filmed by Melbar Entertainment, and has been shown in cinemas across the United States and Canada.

In 2013, he won his first Dora Mavor Moore Award as Best Actor, Musical, for his portrayal of pop-fashion icon Leigh Bowery in Of a Monstrous Child: A Gaga Musical, for which he also received the Toronto Theatre Critics Association Award as Best Actor, Musical. He won his second Dora Mavor Moore Award, for Outstanding Performance by a Male in a Principal Role – Play, in 2014 for his portrayal of Larry/Harry/Garry/Barry in the world premiere of Tim Luscombe's controversial play, PIG for Buddies in Bad Times.

In 2014, he was also nominated for a Helen Hayes Award, as Best Actor, Resident Musical, for Pseudolus in A Funny Thing Happened on the Way to the Forum, for the Tony Award-winning Shakespeare Theatre Company in Washington, D.C. He then appeared as Timothy Sweetman in Dr Silver: A Celebration of Life, a new Canadian musical, presented by Outside The March and The Musical Stage Company in Toronto in 2018.

In 2005, he recorded his debut CD Lucky to Be Me. In 2008, he released a second CD, Keepin' Out Of Mischief.

He is also a professional stage director, a produced composer/lyricist and an experienced theatre educator, specializing in Shakespeare and musical theatre, having taught at colleges and universities across Canada and the United States, including The National Theatre School of Canada, the Stratford Festival Department of Professional Theatre Training, SUNY Plattsburgh, Sheridan College and the Randolph Academy for the Performing Arts.

Dow is series director for the Intimate Experiences Cabaret Series, at Buddies in Bad Times theatre in Toronto.

Filmography

Personal life
Dow is gay and speaks often on issues of sexuality, youth and mental health.

References

External links
 
 
 

1963 births
Living people
American emigrants to Canada
American gay actors
American male comedians
American male musical theatre actors
American male stage actors
American male voice actors
Comedians from Toronto
Comedians from Vancouver
Dora Mavor Moore Award winners
LGBT people from Washington (state)
Male actors from Seattle
Male actors from Toronto
Male actors from Vancouver
21st-century American comedians
21st-century Canadian LGBT people
Canadian male stage actors
Canadian gay actors
Canadian male musical theatre actors
Canadian male voice actors
Canadian male comedians